John Lister Illingworth Fennell (30 May 19189 August 1992) was a British historian of medieval Russian history and of Russian literature. He taught at Cambridge, Nottingham, and London universities, and from 1964 at Oxford, where he was a fellow first at University College, and later at New College. He retired in 1985. His specialty was as a historian, translator, philologist, editor, and teacher of advanced students.

His specialty was the era of Ivan III and 15th century Russia. In evaluating the overall significance of Ivan the Great, Fennell concludes that his reign was "militarily glorious and economically sound," and especially points to his territorial annexations and his centralized control over local rulers. However Fennell adds that his reign was also "a period of cultural depression and spiritual barrenness. Freedom was stamped out within the Russian lands. By his bigoted anti-Catholicism Ivan brought down the curtain between Russia and the west. For the sake of territorial aggrandizement he deprived his country of the fruits of Western learning and civilization."

Dimnick says of Fennell, "His achievements are unrivaled in the West, and almost so in the Soviet Union and Russia".

Bibliography
 
 
 John Lister Illingworth Fennell, editor, Prince A. M. Kurbsky's History of Ivan IV (Cambridge, 1965)

Notes

External links
Translated Penguin Book - at  Penguin First Editions reference site of early first edition Penguin Books.

1918 births
1992 deaths
Historians of Russia
20th-century British historians